Baja: Edge of Control is an off road racing video game developed by American studio 2XL Games and published by THQ for PlayStation 3 and Xbox 360. The game gets its name from the real life Baja 1000 off-road race in Baja California, Mexico, on which it is based. The game is set on over 95 different tracks, including 3 different Baja 250 courses, 2 Baja 500 courses, 1 Baja 1000 course, and has 9 open world environments. The game was released September 22, 2008 in North America and September 26, 2008 in Europe.

Gameplay
The game is targeted as an arcade off road racer, very similar to Colin McRae: Dirt and is based on endurance racing across the desert. Multiplayer options include playing other players through Xbox Live, PlayStation Network, System Link and up to 4 player split screen.

Reception

The game received average ratings from most reviewers averaging out at around 6 or 7 out of 10. However, it's been nominated for the best racing game of 2008 by GameSpot.

Remaster
On March 1, 2017, THQ Nordic announced that Baja: Edge of Control would be remastered as Baja: Edge of Control HD for PlayStation 4, Xbox One and Microsoft Windows with 4K compatibility and improved rendering techniques for shadows, lighting and dust effects. The game was released worldwide in September 2017.

References

External links
 Official website

2008 video games
PlayStation 3 games
PlayStation 4 games
Xbox 360 games
Xbox One games
Multiplayer and single-player video games
Split-screen multiplayer games
Open-world video games
THQ games
THQ Nordic games
Video games set in Mexico
Video games set in the United States
Video games set in Bolivia
Video games set in Costa Rica
Video games developed in the United States
BlitWorks games